Avargalum Ivargalum is a 2011 Indian Tamil language romantic drama film directed by Veerapandian. The film stars newcomers Vimal Natarajan, Sathish, Aishwarya Rajesh and Supraja, with Charle, Manikka Vinayagam, G. M. Kumar, Agathiyan, Boys Rajan, Chinnaponnu, Jayashree and Sundari playing supporting roles. The film, produced by C. Kamaraj, had musical score by Srikanth Deva and was released on 18 March 2011.

Plot
The film begins with Vallal (Vimal Natarajan) and Vennila (Supraja) eloping from their remote village and they take the train. In the train, they meet Bharathi (Sathish) and Shwetha (Aishwarya Rajesh) but the young lovers soon leave them. The next day, in Nagercoil, Vallal and Vennila who have no money struggle to survive. That night, Bharathi and Shwetha find the young lovers in a bus station and take the young lovers with them. In their home, the two couples tell each other the reason why they had to elope.

In a remote village, Vennila was from a rich and upper-caste family. She was pampered by her father Mahadevan (Manikka Vinayagam) and her two brothers. Whereas Vallal was from a poor and lower-caste family and his father Chinnasamy (G. M. Kumar) was a cobbler. Vallal had completed a degree in leather technology in Chennai and was chosen by his college to go to Singapore to pursue his studies but before, Vallal returned to his village. Vennila's family helped Vallal financially to go abroad. Thereafter, Vallal and Vennila fell in love with each other and had to elope.

Similarly, Swetha was the daughter of a rich businessman (Boys Rajan) and was neglected by him. Swetha then found comfort in their car driver Bharathi (Sathish), an orphan who grew up in an orphanage. The two finally fell in love with each other and decided to elope.

The four friends decide to be independent, so they first look for a job. Vallal and Bharathi find employment in a catering service run by a kind-hearted man (Charle). One day, Vennila's brothers find the couple and they have to escape once again. At the temple, the two couples decide to get married and Vennila's brothers track them down. During the escape, the four meet with an accident. Vallal and Swetha survive while Bharathi and Vennila die in the hospital from injuries. Vallal and Swetha are distraught after losing their lovers. Despite being depressed, Vallal finds a job to take care of a mournful Swetha. Swetha's father eventually finds her and decides to take her home but Swetha chooses to stay with Vallal. Vallal and Swetha, being good friends, decide to support and take care of each other.

Cast

Vimal Natarajan as Vallal
Sathish as Bharathi
Aishwarya as Swetha
Supraja as Vennila
Charle as Catering contractor
Manikka Vinayagam as Mahadevan, Vennila's father
G. M. Kumar as Chinnasamy, Vallal's father
Agathiyan as Dr. Thamizhvanan
Boys Rajan as Swetha's father
Chinnaponnu as Vallal's mother
Jayashree as Dr. Seema Thamizhvanan
Sundari as Vennila's mother
Nisha as Valli, Vallal's sister
Meenakshi
Mudikondan
Vengaya Balan
Chinrasu
Thakkar C.
Udhayakumar
Kasi
C. Kamaraj
Laksha in a special appearance

Production
Veerapandian, who had earlier worked with Agathiyan in films like Vaanmathi (1996), Kadhal Kottai (1996) and Gokulathil Seethai (1996), made his directorial debut with Avargalum Ivargalum under the banner of Lakshika Films. Newcomer Vimal Natarajan, Azhagi fame Sathish, Aishwarya Rajesh and Supraja were selected to play the lead roles. Rajesh bagged the role after she approached several film companies and this was the first film that she shot for. Director Agathiyan was also cast to play a doctor. Veerapandian said, "My film is based on a real-life incident that took place in Chennai. It is about a touching incident that happened in a friend’s life. Rest assured, this movie will leave the viewer strengthened and refreshed". The film had been shot extensively in areas like Nagercoil, Virudhachalam and Visakhapatnam.

Soundtrack

The film score and the soundtrack were composed by Srikanth Deva. The soundtrack was released on 18 September 2010 by actress Devayani.

Release
The film was released on 18 March 2011 alongside Muthukku Muthaaga, Minsaram and Lathika.

The New Indian Express wrote, "The inconsistency in the narration, the ambiguity in the scenes of Vallal and Shweta negate the impact of the positive elements [..] The performances too could have been done with more finesse and consistency" and concluded, "It is a plot with potential, had only the director made an effort to infuse some novelty in it. But inexperience comes in the way of executing his ideas on to the screen in a smooth and a convincing way". Dinamalar praised the performances of the actors, the cinematography by Agar Senguttuvan and the songs composed by Srikanth Deva. Kungumam also praised the actors and the songs.

Box office 
The film did not fare well commercially.

References

2011 films
2010s Tamil-language films
Indian romantic drama films
Films scored by Srikanth Deva
Films shot in Visakhapatnam
2011 directorial debut films